The Allegro Resorts Corporation was a major hotel operator and one of the pioneers in all-inclusive travel industry. At its height, Allegro owned 27 properties in the Dominican Republic, Antigua, Morocco, Aruba, Turks and Caicos, Mexico, Venezuela, Jamaica, Costa Rica, Tunisia, St. Kitts and Egypt. The brand portfolio was composed of Caribbean Village, Allegro Resorts, Royal Hideaway and Jack Tar.

Operational structure 
Allegro's operations were grouped into the following segments:
Allegro Resorts Management Services – hotel management company
Allegro Hotel Advisors – sales offices
Allegro Marketing Corporation – marketing offices
Allegro Vacation Club – timeshare division

On September 13, 2000, the company was acquired by Occidental Hotels & Resorts in a $435.2 million transaction. Allegro Hotels and Occidental Hotels & Resorts are now owned by the Barceló Hotel Group.

Notes

References
 Miami Herald: Search Results 
 Daily Herald | Electronic Archive 
 Boca Raton News – Google News Archive Search

Defunct hotel chains